The Land Registration Act 1925 (LRA) was an act of Parliament in the United Kingdom that codified, prioritised and extended the system of land registration in England and Wales. It has largely been repealed, and updated in the Land Registration Act 2002.

Background
After the Land Registry Act 1862 and further attempts in 1875 and 1897 failed, as they either tried to register everything or largely relied on voluntary registration, the 1925 Act was drafted to ensure a more complete, but progressive system.

The LRA 1925 was passed along with a package of reforms of the land and settlement system, including the Law of Property Act 1925, the Trustee Act 1925, the Settled Land Act 1925 and the Land Charges Act 1925. The Act was amended by the Land Registration Act 1936.

The subsequent Commons Registration Act 1965 made reference to the Land Registration Acts 1925 and 1936.

Content
The basic premise of the Act was that interests in registered land had to be registered in order to bind future purchasers of the property. One of the most important provisions was that if someone had not registered the interests listed in section 70, these would nevertheless "override" the rights of a future purchaser. In particular under section 70(1)(g), a person who had an equitable interest under a trust, and who was in actual occupation of the home, would be able to claim an overriding interest. The occupant would have priority over future purchases without his consent, as if his interest had been in fact registered.

See also
 English land law

References

United Kingdom Acts of Parliament 1925
English property law
Acts of the Parliament of the United Kingdom concerning England and Wales
Housing legislation in the United Kingdom
Land registration